
Year 798 (DCCXCVIII) was a common year starting on Monday (link will display the full calendar) of the Julian calendar. The denomination 798 for this year has been used since the early medieval period, when the Anno Domini calendar era became the prevalent method in Europe for naming years.

Events 
 By place 

 Europe 
 Battle of Bornhöved: King Charlemagne forms an alliance with the Obodrites. Together with Prince Drożko (Thrasco), he defeats the Nordalbian Saxons near the village of Bornhöved (modern-day Neumünster), obliging these 'northerners' to submit and give hostages against their future good behavior. In the coming years they are granted areas of present-day Hamburg.
 King Charles the Younger, a son of Charlemagne, conquers Corsica and Sardinia (approximate date).

 Britain 
 King Coenwulf of Mercia invades Gwynedd (modern Wales), and kills his rival Caradog ap Meirion during the fighting in Snowdonia. Kings Cynan and Hywel retake the throne. Coenwulf also defeats and captures King Eadberht Præn of Kent. He is blinded and his hands are cut off. He introduces his brother Cuthred as a sub-king of Kent (approximate date). 
 Battle of Billington: King Eardwulf of Northumbria defeats the nobleman Wada in battle, who has killed former King Æthelred I (see 796).
 King Sigeric I of Essex abdicates and departs for a pilgrimage to Rome. He is succeeded by his son Sigered.

 Iberia 
 King Alfonso II of Asturias campaigns against the Arab Muslims in Al-Andalus. With Frankish military support, he raids into Andalusia and sacks Lisbon (modern Portugal). 
 Bahlul ibn Marzuq, a Vascon-Muslim military leader, revolts in Zaragoza against the Arab-Muslim government of Al-Andalus.

 By topic 

 Religion 
 Alcuin, Anglo-Saxon monk and scholar, writes to his friend, the exiled king Osbald of Northumbria, in order to dissuade him.
 Theodulf, Frankish poet, is appointed bishop of Orléans. He becomes one of Charlemagne's favoured theologians.

Births 
 Abdallah ibn Tahir, Muslim governor (approximate date)
 Babak Khorramdin, Persian military leader (approximate date)
 Ignatius I, patriarch of Constantinople (approximate date)

Deaths 
 Abu Yusuf, Muslim jurist and chief adviser
 Caradog ap Meirion, king of Gwynedd (or 797)
 Lu Mai, chancellor of the Tang Dynasty (b. 739)
 Wonseong, king of Silla (Korea)

References